The Airy Glacier is a glacier  long and  wide, flowing west to the northeast portion of Forster Ice Piedmont, near the west coast of the Antarctic Peninsula.

The glacier was first roughly surveyed by British Graham Land Expedition of 1936–37, then photographed from the air by the Ronne Antarctic Research Expedition in 1947, and surveyed by Falkland Islands Dependencies Survey in 1958.  It was named by United Kingdom Antarctic Place-Names Committee for George Biddell Airy, British Astronomer Royal, who in 1839 introduced a method of correcting magnetic compasses for deviation.

See also
 List of glaciers in the Antarctic
 Norman Peak

References

Glaciers of Palmer Land